Oregon's 6th congressional district is a congressional district created after the 2020 United States census. It consists of Polk and Yamhill Counties, in addition to portions of Marion, Clackamas, and Washington Counties.  It takes in all of urban Salem, as well as the southwestern suburbs of Portland. 

The district elected a member of the United States House of Representatives beginning with the 2022 elections. There were originally sixteen candidates that entered in the race, more than for any other congressional seat in the state in 2022.

History 
On September 27, 2021, Oregon adopted a redistricting plan to be used in the 2022 elections onwards. That plan carved a new 6th congressional district out of parts of the former first and fifth districts. The district had a PVI rating of D+4, as of October 2021.

List of members representing the district

Recent presidential elections

Election results

2022

References

6
Constituencies established in 2023
2023 establishments in Oregon